In the field of mathematics known as algebraic topology, the Gysin sequence is a long exact sequence which relates the cohomology classes of the base space, the fiber and the total space of a sphere bundle. The Gysin sequence is a useful tool for calculating the cohomology rings given the Euler class of the sphere bundle and vice versa.

Definition
Consider a fiber-oriented sphere bundle with total space E, base space M, fiber Sk and projection map
:

Any such bundle defines a degree k + 1 cohomology class e called the Euler class of the bundle.

De Rham cohomology
Discussion of the sequence is clearest with de Rham cohomology. There cohomology classes are represented by differential forms, so that e can be represented by a (k + 1)-form.

The projection map  induces a map in cohomology  called its pullback 

In the case of a fiber bundle, one can also define a pushforward map 

which acts by fiberwise integration of differential forms on the oriented sphere – note that this map goes "the wrong way": it is a covariant map between objects associated with a contravariant functor.

Gysin proved that the following is a long exact sequence

where  is the wedge product of a differential form with the Euler class e.

Integral cohomology
The Gysin sequence is a long exact sequence not only for the de Rham cohomology of differential forms, but also for cohomology with integral coefficients.  In the integral case one needs to replace the wedge product with the Euler class with the cup product, and the pushforward map no longer corresponds to integration.

Gysin homomorphism in algebraic geometry 
Let i: X → Y be a (closed) regular embedding of codimension d, Y → Y a morphism and i: X = X ×Y Y → Y the induced map. Let N be the pullback of the normal bundle of i to X. Then the refined Gysin homomorphism i! refers to the composition

where
 σ is the specialization homomorphism; which sends a k-dimensional subvariety V to the normal cone to the intersection of V and X in V. The result lies in N through .
 The second map is the (usual) Gysin homomorphism induced by the zero-section embedding .

The homomorphism i! encodes intersection product in intersection theory in that one either shows, or defines the intersection product of X and V by, the formula 

Example: Given a vector bundle E, let s: X → E be a section of E. Then, when s is a regular section,  is the class of the zero-locus of s, where [X] is the fundamental class of X.

See also
 Logarithmic form
 Wang sequence

Notes

Sources

Algebraic topology